Potpourri is the third album of Japanese band P-Model.

Overview
On the year of Landsale'''s release, the synthpop boom was reaching critical mass. Bandleader Susumu Hirasawa, feeling the group was in a state of crisis, distanced P-Model from the genre, trying to drive trend followers through rebellious episodes, and replacing their colorful clothing and equipment for a muted getup (black, white, gray and blue). At one concert, a leaflet titled "The Point of Coming to a Concert" was distributed while Landsale was looped endlessly through the PA system; the band did not play until the concertgoers started an uproar which led to a backlash against the band.

Bassist Katsuhiko Akiyama's creative position was in an opposite direction to where Hirasawa wanted to take P-Model, so he was fired from the band, and his songs were not played anymore. He was replaced by high school sophomore Tatsuya Kikuchi, a student of Hirasawa's at the Yamaha Synthesizer School. Kikuchi did not formally join the band while Potpourri was being recorded, leading Hirasawa and keyboardist Yasumi Tanaka to play bass parts on the album, each doing the songs they wrote.Potpourri has a harsher and more off-putting sound than previous albums, with P-Model employing different instruments and experimental recording techniques. Guitar is more prominent than the keyboard-centric albums from before, leaving synthesizers to go almost unused. Hirasawa incorporates greater antagonism into his vocals, sometimes to the point of screaming them.

The album alienated P-Model's fanbase, leaving only a core audience that would persist with Hirasawa throughout his career.

Track listing

"film" contains an interpolation of  1959 translation (originally performed and recorded by Ishii alongside the ) of the traditional French children's song , believed to date no earlier than 1800.

In all releases of the album, the titles with Japanese characters listed are rendered only in them, except for the title track which is rendered as "potpourri (ポプリ)".

Personnel
P-Model – production, arrangements
Susumu Hirasawa – vocals, guitar, bass (1–3, 6, 8, 10, 12–13)
Yasumi Tanaka – Combo organ, synthesizer, bass (4–5, 9, 11), echo machine, backing vocals
Sadatoshi Tainaka – drums, cowbell, percussion, backing vocals

Visual staff
Yūichi Hirasawa (credited as "you. hirasawa") – art director
Hōseki Hirasawa – calligraphy
Api Yomiya – photography
Hiroshi Akasaka – art coordinator

Staff
Makoto Furukawa – engineering, mixing
Yukio Seto – A&R
Kazuhiro Suzuki – production coordinator
Model House – productive management
special thanks to: Tatsuya Kikuchi, Masami Orimo

Release history

The album's single was reissued on CD on a paper sleeve to replicate its original packaging with the band's other Warner-Pioneer released singles as part of the Tower Records exclusive Warner Years Singles Box'' box set in 2012.

References

External links
 Potpourri at NO ROOM – The official site of Susumu Hirasawa (P-MODEL)
 
 Potpourri at SS RECORDINGS Official Site

1981 albums
P-Model albums
Japanese-language albums
Warner Music Japan albums